Agapema homogena, commonly known as the Rocky Mountain Agapema, is a species of giant silkmoth in the family Saturniidae. It is found in Central America and North America.

The MONA or Hodges number for Agapema homogena is 7756.

References

Further reading

 
 
 

Saturniinae
Articles created by Qbugbot
Moths described in 1908